Trail Creek is a stream in the U.S. state of Oregon. It is a tributary to Rogue River.

Trail Creek was named from an old Indian trail which followed its course.

References

Rivers of Oregon
Rivers of Douglas County, Oregon
Rivers of Jackson County, Oregon